Lianhuacun station, is a station of Line 3 and Line 10 of the Shenzhen Metro. Line 3 platforms opened on 28 June 2011 and Line 10 platforms opened on 18 August 2020.

Station layout

Exit

References

Railway stations in Guangdong
Shenzhen Metro stations
Futian District
Railway stations in China opened in 2011